The Botanischer Garten der Universität Karlsruhe is a botanical garden maintained by the Karlsruhe Institute of Technology directorate of Peter Nick. It is located at Am Fasanengarten 2, Karlsruhe, Baden-Württemberg, Germany, and is open weekdays and Sundays; admission is free.

The garden contains a total of 5,700 plant species, including 1,930 endangered species per the IUCN Red List or CITES conventions. It has three major missions:

 Research, particularly in understanding the molecular basis of development, growth, and metabolism, with specific projects in Arabidopsis thaliana, Gnetum gnemon, Nicotiana tabacum, Oryza sativa, and Vitis vinifera. The garden currently cultivates over 50 species of wild grape vines for use in research against downy mildew, as well as a collection of wild rice species from all over the world.
 Teaching, for which the garden provides plant material for the courses and is used for field trips and the comparison of plant types.
 Conservation of rare species and varieties of plants, including Althaea hirsuta, Androsace septentivionalis, Apium graveolens, Campanula cervicaria, Cnidium dubium, Equisetum × trachyodon, Gentiana cruziata, Leonurus cardica, Ludwigia palustris, Marsilea quadrifolia, Polystichum braunii, Populus nigra, Salix repens, Scirpus carinatus, Scirpus triqueter, Stipa ioannis, Taraxacum acoriferum, Taraxacum balticiforme, Taraxacum germanicum, Taraxacum pollichii, Trapa natans, Vaccinium x intermedia, Viola uliginosa, and Vitis vinifera L. ssp. sylvestris. It also maintains good collections of succulents and orchids.

See also 
 Botanischer Garten Karlsruhe, the municipal botanical garden
 List of botanical gardens in Germany

External links 
 Botanischer Garten der Universität Karlsruhe
 Photographs (extensive collection)
 Meinestadt Karlsruhe entry
 BGCI entry

Karlsruhe, Botanischer Garten der Universitat
Karlsruhe, Botanischer Garten der Universitat
Karlsruhe Institute of Technology
Tourist attractions in Karlsruhe